A pretendian (portmanteau of pretend and Indian) is a person who has falsely claimed Indigenous identity by claiming to be a citizen of a Native American or Indigenous Canadian tribal nation, or to be descended from Native ancestors. The term is a pejorative colloquialism, and if used without evidence could be considered defamatory. As a practice, being a pretendian is considered an extreme form of cultural appropriation, especially if that individual then asserts that they can represent, and speak for, communities they do not belong to. It is sometimes also referred to as a form of fraud, ethnic fraud or race shifting.

Early false claims to Indigenous identity, often called "playing Indian", go back at least as far as the Boston Tea Party. There was a rise in pretendians after the 1960s for a number of reasons, such as the reestablishment of tribal sovereignty following the era of Indian termination policy, the media coverage of the Occupation of Alcatraz and the Wounded Knee Occupation, and the formation of Native American studies as a distinct form of area studies which led to the establishment of publishing programs and university departments specifically for or about Native American culture. At the same time, hippie and New Age subcultures marketed Native cultures as accessible, spiritual, and as a form of resistance to mainstream culture, leading to the rise of the plastic shaman or "culture vulture." By 1990, many years of pushback by Native Americans against pretendians resulted in the successful passage of the Indian Arts and Crafts Act of 1990 (IACA) - a truth-in-advertising law which prohibits misrepresentation in marketing of American Indian or Alaska Native arts and crafts products within the United States.

While Indigenous communities have always self-policed and spread word of frauds, mainstream media and arts communities were often unaware, or did not act upon this information, until more recent decades. Since the 1990s and 2000s, a number of controversies regarding ethnic fraud have come to light and received coverage in mainstream media, leading to a broader awareness of pretendians in the world at large.

History of false claims to Indigenous identity

Early claims
Historian Philip J. Deloria has noted that European Americans "playing Indian" is a phenomenon that stretches back at least as far as the Boston Tea Party. In his 1998 book Playing Indian, Deloria argues that white settlers have always played with stereotypical imagery of the peoples that were replaced during colonization, using these tropes to form a new national identity that can be seen as distinct from previous European identities.

Examples of white societies who have played Indian include, according to Deloria, the Improved Order of Red Men, Tammany Hall, and scouting societies like the Order of the Arrow. Individuals who made careers out of pretending an Indigenous identity include James Beckwourth, Chief Buffalo Child Long Lance, and Grey Owl.

The academic Joel W. Martin noted that "an astonishing number of southerners assert they have a grandmother or great-grandmother who was some kind of Cherokee, often a princess", and that such myths serve settler purposes in aligning American frontier romance with southern regionalism and pride.

Post-1960s: Rise of pretendians in academia, arts and political positions
The rise of pretendian identities post-1960s can be explained by a number of factors. The reestablishment and exercise of tribal sovereignty among tribal nations (following the era of Indian termination policy) meant that many individuals raised away from tribal communities sought, and still seek, to reestablish their status as tribal citizens or to recover connections to tribal traditions. Other tribal citizens, who had been raised in American Indian boarding schools under genocidal policies designed to erase their cultural identity, also revived tribal religious and cultural practices.

At the same time, in the years following the Occupation of Alcatraz, the formation of Native American studies as a distinct form of area studies, and the awarding of the Pulitzer Prize for Fiction to Kiowa author N. Scott Momaday, publishing programs and university departments began to be established specifically for or about Native American culture. At the same time, hippie and New Age cultures marketed Native cultures as accessible, spiritual, and as a form of resistance to mainstream culture, leading to the rise of the plastic shaman or "culture vulture."  All of this added up to a culture that was not inclined to disbelieve self-identification, and a wider societal impulse to claim Indigeneity.

Elizabeth Cook-Lynn wrote of the influence of pretendians in academia and political positions:

By 1990, as noted in The New York Times Magazine, many years of "significant pushback by Native Americans against so-called Pretendians or Pretend Indians" resulted in the successful passage of the Indian Arts and Crafts Act of 1990 (IACA) - a truth-in-advertising law which prohibits misrepresentation in marketing of American Indian or Alaska Native arts and crafts products within the United States. The IACA makes it illegal for non-Natives to offer or display for sale, or sell, any art or craft product in a manner that falsely suggests it is Indian produced, an Indian product, or the product of a particular Indian or Indian Tribe or Indian arts and crafts organization. For a first-time violation of the Act, an individual can face civil or criminal penalties up to a $250,000 fine or a five-year prison term, or both. If a business violates the Act, it can face civil penalties or can be prosecuted and fined up to $1,000,000.

2000s: Contemporary controversies
United States Poet Laureate Joy Harjo (Mvskoke) writes:

While Harjo refers to "Native DNA", there is no DNA test that can reliably confirm Native American ancestry, and no DNA test can indicate tribal origin. Attempts by non-Natives to racialize Indigenous identity by DNA tests have been seen by Indigenous people as insensitive at best, often racist, politically and financially motivated, and dangerous to the survival of Indigenous cultures.

While Indigenous communities have always self-policed and spread word of frauds, mainstream media and arts communities were often unaware, or did not act upon this information, until more recent decades. However, since the 1990s and 2000s, a number of controversies regarding ethnic fraud have come to light and received coverage in mainstream media, leading to a broader awareness of pretendians in the world at large.

In April 2018, APTN National News in Canada investigated how pretendians - in the film industry and in real life - promote "stereotypes, typecasting, and even, what is known as 'redface.'" Rebecca Nagle (Cherokee Nation) voiced a similar position in 2019, writing for High Country News that,

In January 2021, Navajo journalist Jacqueline Keeler began investigating the problem of settler self-indigenization in academia. Working with other Natives in tribal enrollment departments, genealogists and historians, they began following up on the names many had been hearing for years in tribal circles were not actually Native, asking about current community connections as well as researching family histories "as far back as the 1600s" to see if they had any ancestors who were Native or had ever lived in a tribal community. This research resulted in the Alleged Pretendians List, of about 200 public figures in academia and entertainment, which Keeler self-published as a Google spreadsheet in 2021.

While some people have criticized her for "conducting a witch hunt", Native leaders interviewed by VOA, such as Shawnee Chief Ben Barnes, report Keeler has strong support in Native circles. Academic Dina Gilio-Whitaker, who reviewed Keeler’s documentation on Sacheen Littlefeather before it was published (see below), wrote that in her opinion Keeler did solid research. Keeler has stressed that the list does not include private citizens who are "merely wannabes", but only those public figures who are monetizing and profiting from their claims to tribal identity and who claim to speak for Native American tribes. She says the list is the product of decades of Native peoples' efforts at accountability. Academic Kim TallBear writes that all those mentioned on the list are public figures who have profited from their alleged Indigenous status, that Keeler’s and her team’s list documents that the overwhelming number of those who benefit financially from pretendianism are white, and that these false claims are related to white supremacy and Indigenous erasure. Tallbear stresses that people who fabricate fraudulent claims are in no way the same as disconnected and reconnecting descendants who have real heritage, such as victims of government programs that scooped Indigenous children from their families.

On September 13, 2021, the CBC News reported on their ongoing investigation into a "mysterious letter", dated 1845 (but never seen before 2011) that is now believed to be a forgery. Based solely on the one ancestor listed in this letter, over 1,000 people were enrolled as Algonquin people, making them "potential beneficiaries of a massive pending land claim agreement involving almost $1 billion and more than 500 sq. kilometres of land". The CBC investigation used handwriting analysis, and other methods of archival and historical evaluation to conclude the letter is a fake. This has led to the federally recognized Pikwakanagan First Nation to renew efforts to remove these "pretendian" claimants from their membership. In a statement to CBC News, the chief and council of the Algonquins of Pikwakanagan First Nation say that those they are seeking to remove "are fraudulently taking up Indigenous spaces in high academia and procurement opportunities."

In October 2021, the CBC published an investigation into the status of Canadian academic Carrie Bourassa, who works as an Indigenous health expert and has claimed Métis, Anishinaabe and Tlingit status. Research into her claims indicated that her ancestry is wholly European. In particular, the great-grandmother she claimed was Tlingit, Johanna Salaba, is well-documented as having emigrated from Russia in 1911; she was a Czech-speaking Russian. In response, Bourassa admitted that she does not have status in the communities that she claimed but insisted that she does have some Indigenous ancestors and that she has hired other genealogists to search for them. Bourassa was placed on immediate leave from her post at the Canadian Institutes of Health Research after her claims of Indigenous ancestry were found to be baseless.

In November 2021, writing for the Toronto Star about the Bourassa situation as well as the actions of Joseph Boyden and Michelle Latimer, K.J. McCusker wrote,

In October 2022, actor and activist Sacheen Littlefeather died. Shortly thereafter her sisters spoke to Navajo reporter Jacqueline Keeler and said that their family has no ties to the Apache or Yaqui tribes Sacheen had claimed. As Littlefeather had been a beloved activist, these reports were met with controversy, challenges, and attacks on Keeler, largely on social media. Academic Dina Gilio-Whitaker wrote that the truth about community leaders is "crucial", even if it means losing a "hero", and that the work Littlefeather did is still valuable, but there is a need to be honest about the harm done by pretendians, especially by those who manage to fool so many people that they become iconic:

Motivating factors 

There are several possible explanations for why people adopt pretendian identities. Mnikȟówožu Lakota poet Trevino Brings Plenty writes: "To wear an underrepresented people's skin is enticing. I get it: to feast on struggle, to explore imagined roots; to lay the foundational work for academic jobs and publishing opportunities."

Patrick Wolfe argues that the problem is more structural, stating that settler colonial ideology actively needs to erase and then reproduce Indigenous identity in order to create and justify claims to land and territory. Deloria also explores the white American dual fascination with "the vanishing Indian" and the idea that, by "Playing Indian", the white man can then be the true inheritor and preserver of authentic American identity and connection to the land, aka "Indianness".

Academics Kim TallBear (Sisseton Wahpeton Oyate), Dina Gilio-Whitaker (Colville), Robert Jago (Kwantlen First Nation), Rowland Robinson (Menominee), as well as journalist Jacqueline Keeler (Navajo Nation) and attorney Jean Teillet (great-grandniece of Louis Riel) also name white supremacy, in addition to ongoing settler colonialism, as core factors in the phenomenon. In Settler Colonialism + Native Ghosts - "Community, Pretendians, & Heartbreak", Robinson posits that

In October 2022, Teillet published the report, Indigenous Identity Fraud, for the University of Saskatchewan. Discussing her research, she wrote for the Globe and Mail,

Notable examples
Individuals who have been accused of being a pretendian include:

Academic
 Ward Churchill (born 1947) A professor of ethnic studies and political activist, Churchill built his career on his claims of Indigenous identity that were unsupported by membership in any tribe or by later genealogical research that failed to find any evidence of Indigenous ancestry.
 Rachel Dolezal (born 1977) Although Dolezal is better known for claiming to be African-American, she began her career claiming to be Native American, telling people that she was born in a tipi and grew up hunting for food with bows and arrows.
 Susan Taffe Reed Former director of Dartmouth College's Native American Program. Fired in 2015 "after tribal officials and alumni accused her of misrepresenting herself as an American Indian".
 Andrea Smith Smith has built a career as a scholar, author and activist based on her claim that she is a Cherokee woman. Despite many articles and statements by Cherokee people and genealogists stating she has no Cherokee heritage or citizenship, she has never retracted her claim.
 Terry Tafoya Now going by the name Ty Nolan. A former psychology professor at Evergreen State College, claimed Warm Springs and Taos Pueblo heritage. False claims reported by the Seattle Post-Intelligencer in 2006.
 Vianne Timmons (born 1958) Current president of Memorial University of Newfoundland. Claimed Mi'kmaq ancestry but not identity. Had Bras d'Or Mi'kmaq tribal membership in 2009, but the group is not recognized by either the federal government or other Mi'kmaq groups. Later stepped away.
 Mary Ellen Turpel-Lafond (born 1963) Lawyer; former academic; former judge. False claims to Indigenous ancestry exposed by the Canadian Broadcasting Corporation in 2022.

Film and television
Kelsey Asbille (born 1991) A Chinese-American actress who has been cast in numerous Native American roles. She has falsely claimed descent from the Eastern Band of Cherokee Indians (EBCI) and a "Cherokee identity". In response, the EBCI issued a statement that "Kelsey Asbille (Chow) is not now nor has she ever been an enrolled member of the Eastern Band of Cherokee Indians. No documentation was found in our records to support any claim that she descends from the Eastern Band of Cherokee Indians.”
"Iron Eyes" Cody (1904–1999) Born as Espera Oscar de Corti, and came to be known as "The Crying Indian". An Italian-American actor most well known for his appearance in a 1970's anti-littering commercial. Cody pretended to be from various tribes and denied his Italian heritage for the rest of his life.
Johnny Depp (born 1963) An actor who has claimed both Creek and Cherokee descent on numerous occasions, including when cast as Tonto in the 2013 film The Lone Ranger, but who has no documented Native ancestry, is not a citizen in any tribe, and is regarded as "a non-Indian" and a "pretendian" by Native leaders. During the promotion for The Lone Ranger LaDonna Harris, a member of the Comanche Nation, adopted Depp, making him her honorary son, but not a member of any tribe.
Sacheen Littlefeather (1946–2022) Born Maria Louise Cruz, an actress who took the stage in Plains-style attire at the Academy Awards to decline the 1972 Best Actor award on behalf of Marlon Brando for The Godfather. Presenting herself throughout her life as a White Mountain Apache and Yaqui activist for Native American rights who had grown up in a hovel without a toilet, her sisters and others later said her heritage was actually half–Mexican-Hispanic of Spanish-European descent and half white. An investigation by the Navajo writer-activist Jacqueline Keeler and her team, and reviewed by academics prior to publication, revealed no apparent ties to any tribe in the United States.

Literary

 Joseph Boyden (born 1966) A novelist of Irish and Scottish ancestry best known for writing about First Nations culture who has no recognized tribal membership and whose familial and DNA-based claims to Indigenous ancestry have failed efforts at verification and were summarized by his ex-wife as "no DNA that can be traced to the First Nations people in Canada or the Americas at large".
 Asa Earl Carter (1925–1979) Published using the pseudonym Forrest Carter as a supposed Cherokee. The founder of a Ku Klux Klan paramilitary group and a white supremacist politician under his birth name, he used his pseudonym to write popular books including The Rebel Outlaw: Josey Wales and The Education of Little Tree. Also known for co-authoring George Wallace's tagline, "Segregation now, segregation tomorrow, segregation forever".
 Grey Owl (1888–1938) An Englishman born as Archibald Stansfeld Belaney who became a woodsman and wrote books and gave lectures as an activist primarily on environmental and conservationism issues, but was exposed after his death as having falsely claimed his Indigenous identity.
 Jamake Highwater (1931–2001) A prolific American writer and journalist born as Jackie Marks who passed as Cherokee and used Native American culture as his writing theme although he was actually of eastern European Jewish ancestry.
 Chief Buffalo Child Long Lance (1890–1932) The persona of the African-American journalist, writer and film actor Sylvester Clark Long, who falsely claimed Blackfoot and Cherokee heritage.
Brooke Medicine Eagle (born 1943)  the pseudonym of Brooke Edwards, an American author, singer-songwriter, and teacher specializing in a New Age interpretation of Native American religion.
 Nasdijj (born 1950) The pseudonym of writer Tim Barrus, an American author and social worker best known for having published three "memoirs" between 2000 and 2004 while presenting himself as a Navajo.
 Red Thunder Cloud (1919–1996) Born Cromwell Ashbie Hawkins West, also known as Carlos Westez, a singer, dancer, storyteller, and field researcher who was promoted as the last fluent speaker of the Catawba language, but was later revealed to have learned what little he knew of the language from books and to have been of African American heritage.
 Sat-Okh (1920–2003), also known as Stanisław Supłatowicz, was a writer, artist, and soldier who served during World War II, that claimed to be of Polish and Shawnee descent. His origins were heavily disputed.
 Margaret Seltzer (born 1975) The writer of a "memoir" of her supposed experiences as a half–Native American foster child and gang member in South Central Los Angeles and was later revealed to have completely fabricated the story after growing up in an affluent neighborhood with no Native American background or heritage.
 Erika T. Wurth is a novelist claiming Apache/Chickasaw/Cherokee descent whose novel White Horse was reviewed favourably in the New York Times. In 2023, an article in the New York Post provided researched evidence to suggest that this was a family legend without basis in fact.

Political
 Carrie Bourassa A scientific director of the Indigenous health arm of the Canadian Institutes of Health Research who claimed to be Métis, Anishnaabe and Tlingit. She was placed on immediate leave after the Canadian Broadcasting Corporation (CBC) found no evidence to support her repeated claims of Indigenous ancestry.
 Kaya Jones (born 1984) A singer and model who joined the National Diversity Coalition for Trump as their "Native American Ambassador"; she falsely claimed to be Apache.
 Danielle Smith - Premier of Alberta who claimed to have a Cherokee great-great-grandmother who was a victim of the Trail of Tears. An investigation from APTN National News found no evidence Smith's ancestors were Indigenous or part of the Trail of Tears.
 Elizabeth Warren (born 1949) A U.S. Senator and presidential candidate who claimed Cherokee and Delaware ancestry. She attempted to support her claim by releasing a video with DNA analysis, but her DNA claims were rejected by the Cherokee Nation, with then Cherokee Nation Secretary of State, Chuck Hoskin Jr. (now Principal Chief of the Nation) stating in a press release in response, "Using a DNA test to lay claim to any connection to the Cherokee Nation or any tribal nation, even vaguely, is inappropriate and wrong." Warren eventually expressed regret and apologized for "claiming American Indian heritage".
 Mary Ellen Turpel-Lafond (born 1963) A Canadian lawyer, former judge, Aboriginal Scholar, and advocate falsely claimed Treaty Indian status as a Cree Nation member.

Visual arts 
 Gina Adams (born 1965) A visual artist and assistant professor at Emily Carr University, Adams claims White Earth Ojibwe and Lakota ancestry, and that her grandfather lived on the White Earth Indian Reservation and was removed at age eight to attend Carlisle Indian Industrial School, which closed in 1918. Genealogists reported that Adams' grandfather "was a white man named Albert Theriault, who was born in Massachusetts to French-Canadian parents." Adams has also claimed that her great-great-grandfather was Ojibwe chief Wabanquot (1830–1898), a signer of the 1867 federal treaty with the Chippewa of the Mississippi. She has shown no evidence supporting any of these claims. She claims to be only a descendant, not an enrolled tribal member, so she and her gallery have so far successfully evaded the US Indian Arts and Crafts Act of 1990.
 Jimmie Durham (1940–2021) An artist and activist who claimed one-quarter Cherokee descent by blood and to have grown up in a Cherokee-speaking community, Durham exhibited his work in the U.S. as Native American art until the passage of the Indian Arts and Crafts Act of 1990 prohibiting false claims of Native production of arts and crafts that are offered for sale; he subsequently left the United States and has continued to claim Cherokee identity in European exhibitions. He was also formerly an organizer and central committee member for the American Indian Movement, including working as chief administrator for the International Indian Treaty Council. However, he has been reported to have "no known ties to any Cherokee community" and to be "neither enrolled nor eligible for citizenship" in any of the three federally recognized Cherokee tribes.
 Yeffe Kimball (1906–1978) An artist who claimed to be Osage. Born Effie Goodman, she made Native American art under her assumed identify but also engaged in Native American political activism.
 Cheyanne Turions An artist and art curator who claimed an Indigenous Canadian identity for grant applications until "outed" in 2021, Turions later stated that she had investigated her family's history and that as a result "I changed my self-identification to settler," and resigned from her position as a curator.

See also
 Australian Aboriginal identity
 Cherokee descent
 Eatock v Bolt, Australian case
 Eastern Metis
 Indian Arts and Crafts Act of 1990
 Índia pega no laço
 List of unrecognized tribes in the United States
 Native American ancestry
 Native Americans in German popular culture
 Passing (racial identity)
 Plastic shaman
 Racial misrepresentation
 :Category:American people who self-identify as being of Native American descent
 Reel Injun A 2009 Canadian documentary film about the portrayal of Native Americans in Hollywood films
 Stolen Valor Act of 2013, US law
Qalipu First Nation

Notes

References

Further reading
 Browder, Laura. Slippery Characters: Ethnic Impersonators and American Identities. Chapel Hill: University of North Carolina Press, 2000.
 Chavers, Dean. "Around the Campfire: Fake Indians". Native Times, 2013.
 Gaudry, Adam. "Communing with the Dead: The 'New Métis,' Métis Identity Appropriation, and the Displacement of Living Métis Culture.". American Indian Quarterly, 42, no. 2 (2018): pp. 162–90
 Leroux, Darryl. Distorted Descent: White Claims to Indigenous Identity. University of Manitoba Press, 2019.
 Leroux, Darryl. "Inventing an Indigenous People in Algonquin Territory". Canadian Journal of History, vol 56, pp. 71–72, 2021.
 Leroux, Darryl. "Self-made Métis". Maisonneuve, 2018.
 Reese, Debbie. Native? Or, not? A Resource List. American Indians in Children's Literature, February 2021.
 Robinson, Rowland. Settler Colonialism + Native Ghosts: An Autoethnographic Account of the Imaginarium of Late Capitalist/Colonialist Storytelling, "Chapter 4. Interlude: Community, Pretendians, & Heartbreak". Waterloo, Ontario: University of Waterloo, 2020.
 Sturm, Circe. Becoming Indian: The Struggle Over Cherokee Identity in the Twenty-First Century. Santa Fe: School for Advanced Research, 2010.
 TallBear, Kim. Native American DNA: Tribal Belonging and the False Promise of Genetic Science. University of Minnesota Press, 2013.
 Tuck, Eve; Yang, K. Wayne. "Decolonization is not a metaphor". Moves to Innocence I: Settler Nativism, pp. 10–13. Decolonization: Indigeneity, Education & Society, 2012.

External links 

 APTN Investigates: Cowboys and Pretendians APTN National News television report featuring many of the examples in this article, notably those in film 
 The Convenient "Pretendian", Canada Land podcast
 "Indigenous 'Race Shifting' Red Flags: A Quick Primer for Reporters and Others", by Kim TallBear (Sisseton-Wahpeton) 
 "Playing Pretendian", Code Switch, NPR
 Pretendians and Their Impact on Métis Identity in the Academy - University of Saskatchewan panel discussion including Maria Campbell (Métis) - 10 Dec 2021 
 The Pretendian Problem - Indian Country Today video report on pretendians and fake Métis - 28 Jan 2021
 Raceshifting, resource on Eastern Euro-Canadians and Euro-Americans posting as Indigenous peoples
 Unsettling Genealogies Conference - A Forum on Pseudo Indians, Race-Shifting, Pretendians, and Self-Indigenization in Media, Arts, Politics and the Academy - Series of 8 panel presentations in Spring, 2022, at Michigan State University. 
 Teillet Report on Indigenous Identity Fraud - October 2022 report for the University of Saskatchewan

Literary forgeries
Impostors
Multiracial affairs in the United States
Native American-related controversies
Cultural appropriation
Race in Canada